Disney's Extreme Skate Adventure is a 2003 skateboarding game developed by Toys for Bob for the PlayStation 2, GameCube, and Xbox, and Vicarious Visions for Game Boy Advance, and published by Activision. The game uses the same game engine as 2002's Tony Hawk's Pro Skater 4 and features characters from Disney's The Lion King and Tarzan, and Pixar's Toy Story.

Gameplay
Players skate around each level performing various tricks, using either characters from Disney/Pixar's Toy Story, Disney's Tarzan and Disney's The Lion King, or with a fully customizable human skater, as well as two real-life child skaters, 8-year-old Ryan Holleran and 10-year-old Mallie Ann Torres. There are three main modes: Adventure, Free Skate, and Versus. In Adventure, the player will take on a variety of skate challenges across the three worlds. All skaters are restricted to their respective worlds, but the human skater can move in and out of any world. In Free Skate, the player is free to play as any skater, but all challenges are disabled, and the restrictions on which world the skater is playable still apply. In Versus, two players can play any skater in any world and compete in a series of skate games.

Reception

Disney's Extreme Skate Adventure for the GameCube, PlayStation 2 and Xbox received "generally positive" reviews, according to review aggregator Metacritic. In his review of the GameCube version for GameSpot, Jeff Gerstmann positively noted how much the game mechanically felt like the Tony Hawk's games, particularly Tony Hawk's Pro Skater 4. He added that although the game was primarily designed for children, it "still presents something of a challenge", concluding that it was a "fun, well-designed skating game." Louis Bedigian, reviewing the Xbox version for GameZone, complimented the "cartoony graphics" which she called "great", as well as the enjoyableness of the "Tony Hawk-style gameplay", and summed up by saying that "any adult that gives it a chance will find that it's much more than a kiddie game."

In contrast to the console versions, the Game Boy Advance version received "mixed or average" reviews according to Metacritic. In their review, IGN called the handheld edition a game with sufficient challenges "no matter what your skill level" and complemented the variety of tasks but criticised the "dumbed down" gameplay when compared to the handheld Tony Hawk's games.

Notes

References

External links

2003 video games
Activision games
Disney video games
Disney sports video games
Game Boy Advance games
GameCube games
Multiplayer and single-player video games
PlayStation 2 games
Skateboarding video games
Toys for Bob games
Xbox games
Video games set in Africa
Video games with custom soundtrack support
Video games developed in the United States
Vicarious Visions games